Proctor Wildlife Sanctuary is a protected area maintained by the New Hampshire Audubon Society. It is located in Center Harbor, New Hampshire.

The land was donated to the New Hampshire Audubon Society in memory of Jean K. Proctor in 1975.

References 

Wildlife sanctuaries of the United States
Protected areas of Belknap County, New Hampshire
Nature reserves in New Hampshire
Center Harbor, New Hampshire